Květa is a Slavic female given name, derived from the Czech word květ meaning flower, blossom. Květa is also a nickname form of Květoslava (pronounced kvye-taw-slah-vah.)

Other forms 
Slovak: Kveta, Kvetava, Kvetana
Russian: Cvetana
Bulgarian: Cveta, Cvetana, Cvetomira
Serbian: Cveta, Cvetana, Cvetislava, Cvetoslava, Cvetimira, Cvijeta
Croatian: Cveta, Cvetana, Cvetislava, Cvetoslava, Cvetimira

Name Days 
Czech: 20 June (Květa), 8 December (Květoslava)

Famous bearers 
Květa Fialová, Czech actress
Květa Peschke, Czech tennis player
Květa Jeriová, Czech cross country skier
Květa Legátová, Czech writer
Květa Kočová, Czech speaker of ČSSD
Květa Pacovská, Czech painter and sculptor
Květoslava Kořínková, Czech politician and pedagogue

See also

Slavic names

References 
Miloslava Knappová, Jak se bude vaše dítě jmenovat?

External links 
Behind the Name

Czech feminine given names
Slavic feminine given names